Lacus Luxuriae (Latin lūxuriae, "Lake of Luxury") is a small lunar mare on the far side of Moon. It is located at 19.0° N, 176.0° E and is 50 km in diameter.

Lacus Luxuriae is at the center of the Freundlich-Sharonov Basin.

References

Luxuriae